Capt.  Eric Templeton Young (14 May 1892 – 28 June 1915) was a Scottish rugby union player and British Army officer who was killed in the Gallipoli campaign in World War I.

Young was educated in Edinburgh at Cargilfield Preparatory School and Fettes College. He attended Magdalen College, Oxford, where he played for the university. He also played for Glasgow Academy and the Glasgow Academicals. He had one cap for  against  in March 1914, the final international game on British soil before the war began.

Young joined the Territorial Army in 1911. He was promoted to captain when the war began and sent to Turkey with the 8th Battalion of The Cameronians. Two weeks after he arrived in Gallipoli, he was killed in the first day of the Battle of Gully Ravine. He is commemorated on the Helles Memorial.

References

External links
 "An entire team wiped out by the Great War".  The Scotsman, 6 November 2009

1892 births
1915 deaths
People educated at Cargilfield School
People educated at Fettes College
Alumni of Magdalen College, Oxford
British Army personnel of World War I
British military personnel killed in World War I
Cameronians officers
Glasgow Academicals rugby union players
Rugby union players from Glasgow
Scotland international rugby union players
Scottish rugby union players